Julio Faustino Quevedo Elias (born 17 October 1939) is a former Guatemalan athlete who competed in multiple Summer Olympics. Quevedo won a bronze medal at the 1967 Central American and Caribbean Championships in Athletics in the 5000 m. At the 1968 and 1972 Summer Games, he participated in a total of six events. In 1968, he ran in the 1,500 m, 3,000 m steeplechase, and 5,000 m events. Four years later, he again ran in the 3,000 m steeplechase, and competed in the 10,000 m and marathon; he finished 54th in the latter event. Quevedo posted his career-best marathon time of 2:27:20 the next year. His top marks in other disciplines had been set between 1968 and 1971. In the 1,500 m, he had a best time of 3:58.1 in 1968; Quevedo then set personal records in the 5,000 m (14:20.4) and 10,000 m (30:06.8) in 1970, and the next year had his fastest time, 9:22.5, in the 3,000 m steeplechase.

Achievements

References

1939 births
20th-century Guatemalan people
21st-century Guatemalan people
Athletes (track and field) at the 1968 Summer Olympics
Athletes (track and field) at the 1972 Summer Olympics
Central American Games medalists in athletics
Central American Games silver medalists for Guatemala
Guatemalan male long-distance runners
Guatemalan male marathon runners
Guatemalan steeplechase runners
Living people
Olympic athletes of Guatemala